Baron May, of Weybridge in the County of Surrey, is a title in the Peerage of the United Kingdom. It was created on 28 June 1935 for the financial expert Sir George May, 1st Baronet. He was for many years secretary of the Prudential Assurance Company. May had already been created a Baronet, of the Eyot, in the Parish of Weybridge in the County of Surrey on 27 January 1931, in the Baronetage of the United Kingdom. Since 2006, the titles are held by his great-grandson.

May Baronets (1931)
Sir George Ernest May, 1st Baronet (1871–1946), created Baron May in 1935

Barons May (1935)
George Ernest May, 1st Baron May, 1st Baronet (1871–1946)
John Lawrence May, 2nd Baron May, 2nd Baronet (1904–1950)
Michael St John May, 3rd Baron May, 3rd Baronet (1931–2006)
Jasper Bertram St John May, 4th Baron May, 4th Baronet (b. 1965)

There is no heir to the barony.

References

Baronies in the Peerage of the United Kingdom
Noble titles created in 1935